Enzo Corvi (born December 23, 1992) is a Swiss professional ice hockey center who currently plays for HC Davos of the National League (NL).

Playing career
Corvi made his professional debut in the lower Swiss leagues with his hometown club, EHC Chur. On May 1, 2012, Corvi left Chur to sign with NLA stalwart club, HC Davos.

With Davos, Corvi played at the 2012 Spengler Cup, where they lost the final match against Team Canada 7-2. In the tournament, he scored his first goal for Davos against Adler Mannheim. Corvi played alongside Joe Thornton, who played due to the 2012 Lockout with Davos. Selected for the 2018 IIHF World Championship with Switzerland men's team he won a silver medal.

On December 18, 2018, Corvi agreed to a four-year contract extension with HC Davos worth CHF 2.4 million.

On August 5, 2021, Corvi agreed to an early four-year contract extension with HC Davos through the 2025/26 season.

Career statistics

Regular season and playoffs

International

References

External links

1992 births
Living people
HC Davos players
Ice hockey players at the 2018 Winter Olympics
Ice hockey players at the 2022 Winter Olympics
Olympic ice hockey players of Switzerland
Swiss ice hockey centres
People from Chur
Sportspeople from Graubünden